Beaufortia incana, commonly known as grey-leaved beaufortia, is a plant in the myrtle family Myrtaceae, and is endemic to southwest of Western Australia. It is a shrub with crowded leaves that appear whitish due to their covering of fine, soft hairs on both surfaces. It has almost spherical heads of red flowers in spring.

Description
The leaves are arranged alternately, crowded on the younger stems, linear to lance-shaped and arranged in alternate pairs (decussate) so that they make four rows along the stems.

The flowers have 5 sepals, 5 petals and 5 bundles of stamens. The stamens give the flowers their colour and are in bundles of 3, joined for most of their length, the bundles of different lengths. Flowering occurs from August to December and is followed by fruit that are woody capsules.

Taxonomy and naming
Beaufortia macrostemon var. incana was first formally described in 1867 by George Bentham in Flora Australiensis. In 1972, Alex George raised it to species status in Nuytsia. The specific epithet ("incana") is a Latin word meaning "quite gray".

Distribution and habitat
Beaufortia incana grows in kwongan and shrubland in the Avon Wheatbelt, Jarrah Forest, Mallee and Swan Coastal Plain biogeographic regions of south-western Western Australia. It grows in soils derived from laterite on hills and sandplains.

Conservation
Beaufortia incana is classified as "not threatened" by the Western Australian Government Department of Parks and Wildlife.

References

incana
Plants described in 1867
Taxa named by George Bentham
Endemic flora of Western Australia